University of Gaza may refer to:

Islamic University of Gaza
Al-Azhar University – Gaza